Margie Eugene-Richard (born 1941 or 1942) is an African American environmental activist. Richard had grown up in the neighborhood of Old Diamond in Norco, Louisiana, in the middle of "Cancer Alley". She was the first African-American to win the Goldman Environmental Prize in 2004, for her successful campaign for relocating people who lived in a community close to a chemical plant in Norco, Louisiana.  Eugene-Richard says: "you have to go out and command justice. Somebody has to ask God for the inner strength to be bold."

"Margie believes in the community leading the way," says Dr. Beverly Wright, director of the Deep South Center for Environmental Justice. But as Richard recognizes, community is an elusive thing in post-Katrina New Orleans. "I won't be knocking on doors," she says, "because there are no doors."

See also
 Shell plant explosion in Diamond, Louisiana

References 

Year of birth missing (living people)
Place of birth missing (living people)
Living people
People from Louisiana
American environmentalists
American women environmentalists
Goldman Environmental Prize awardees
21st-century American women